Joshua Joseph Ravin (born January 21, 1988) is an American professional baseball pitcher who is currently a free agent. He previously played in Major League Baseball (MLB) for the Los Angeles Dodgers and Atlanta Braves and for the Chiba Lotte Marines of Nippon Professional Baseball (NPB).

Early life
Josh Ravin was born in West Hills, California on January 21, 1988, to parents Virgil and Lana Ravin. He has an older brother, Joel and a younger sister, Amanda.

Career

Cincinnati Reds
The Cincinnati Reds selected Ravin in the fifth round, 144th overall, of the 2006 MLB Draft out of Chatsworth High School in Chatsworth, Los Angeles, California. He made his professional debut with the Gulf Coast Reds in 2006, and also appeared for the rookie-level Billings Mustangs]. In 2007, Ravin pitched returned to Billings, where he recorded a 1-5 record and 8.55 ERA in 13 games. The following year, Ravin split the season between Billings and the Single-A Dayton Dragons, posting a cumulative 2-9 record and 7.77 ERA in 18 appearances. In 2009, Ravin returned to Dayton, where he pitched to a 3-8 record and 3.67 ERA with 66 strikeouts in 81.0 innings of work.

Ravin split the 2010 season between the High-A Lynchburg Hillcats, Dayton, and the AZL Reds, accumulating a 5-7 record and 3.89 ERA in 19 games between the three teams. Ravin was named the Carolina League pitcher of the week for August 9–15, 2010 while playing for Lynchburg. In 2011, Ravin split the season between the High-A Bakersfield Blaze and the Double-A Carolina Mudcats, logging a cumulative 2-10 record and 5.17 ERA with 114 strikeouts in 123.2 innings pitched. In 2012, Ravin split the year between Bakersfield and the Double-A Pensacola Blue Wahoos, posting a 1-3 record and 5.33 ERA in 23 games.

The Reds added Ravin to their 40-man roster after the 2012 season and invited him to spring training in 2013. He was designated for assignment by the Reds on September 16, 2013 after posting a 4.82 ERA in 48 combined games for Double-A Pensacola in the Southern League and the Triple-A Louisville Bats in the International League.

Milwaukee Brewers
On September 19, 2013, Ravin was claimed off waivers by the Milwaukee Brewers. On October 23, Ravin was outrighted off of the 40-man roster and assigned to the Triple-A Nashville Sounds. On November 4, 2013, he elected free agency.

Los Angeles Dodgers
On December 13, 2013, Ravin signed a minor league contract with the Los Angeles Dodgers organization. He split the 2014 season between the Double-A Chattanooga Lookouts and Triple-A Albuquerque Isotopes. With the two teams, he was 2–1 with a 3.55 ERA in 23 games. The Dodgers invited him to attend major league spring training in 2015 but he did not make the team and was assigned to the Triple-A Oklahoma City Dodgers to begin the year.

Ravin was called up to the majors for the first time on June 2, 2015. He made his MLB debut that night against the Colorado Rockies, striking out the only batter he faced, DJ LeMahieu, and picking up the win. He appeared in a total of nine games for the Dodgers in 2015, allowing seven runs in  innings. He also pitched in 22 games for Oklahoma City with a 3.86 ERA.

Ravin broke the radius bone in his left forearm in a multi-vehicle car crash on February 29, 2016. The injury required surgery. Ravin began the 2016 season on the 15-day disabled list. On May 10, Ravin was suspended for 80 games by MLB for testing positive for pralmorelin, a banned performance-enhancing drug. Ravin was reinstated on August 3, and optioned to Triple-A, but rejoined the Dodgers on August 8. He appeared in 10 games with Los Angeles, posting a 0.93 ERA in  innings in 2016.

Ravin suffered a groin injury in spring training in 2017, causing him to begin the season on the disabled list. He was taken off the DL and optioned to Oklahoma City on May 10. He did manage to appear in 14 games for the Dodgers in 2017, with a 6.48 ERA as well as 30 games for Oklahoma City, where he had a 5.09 ERA. His groin issue recurred all season, leading to several stints on the disabled list and he was eventually shut down for good on September 22. On November 20, 2017, Ravin was designated for assignment by the Dodgers.

Atlanta Braves
On November 20, 2017, Ravin was traded to the Atlanta Braves in exchange for cash considerations. On March 5, 2018, the Braves outrighted Ravin off the 40-man roster. On March 31, Ravin was called up by the Braves and had his contract purchased back to the 40-man roster by the team. He was designated for assignment on April 21, after he posted a 6.00 ERA in 2 big league games. He was outrighted to the Triple-A Gwinnett Stripers on April 25, 2018.

On June 14, 2018, while pitching for Gwinnett, Ravin was hit in the head by a line drive.  After several minutes he was able to stand up but needed assistance exiting the field. He elected free agency on October 11, 2018.

Chiba Lotte Marines
On January 7, 2019, Ravin signed with the Chiba Lotte Marines of Nippon Professional Baseball (NPB). Ravin spent the majority of the year with Lotte's farm team, only making two appearances for the main club, where he struggled mightily, facing 12 batters and allowing 5 earned runs in  innings of work. On November 30, the Marines announced that they would not re-sign Ravin for the 2020 season. On December 2, he became a free agent.

Lexington Legends
On May 4, 2021, Ravin signed with the Lexington Legends of the Atlantic League of Professional Baseball. Ravin recorded a 2.57 ERA in 7 appearances before he was released on July 2.

Personal life
Ravin's brother, Joel, was shot five times after being kidnapped on October 4, 2015 and survived.

See also
List of Major League Baseball players suspended for performance-enhancing drugs

References

External links

1988 births
Living people
Albuquerque Isotopes players
American expatriate baseball players in Japan
American sportspeople in doping cases
Arizona League Dodgers players
Arizona League Reds players
Atlanta Braves players
Baseball players from California
Bakersfield Blaze players
Billings Mustangs players
Carolina Mudcats players
Chattanooga Lookouts players
Chiba Lotte Marines players
Dayton Dragons players
Gulf Coast Reds players
Los Angeles Dodgers players
Louisville Bats players
Lynchburg Hillcats players
Major League Baseball pitchers
Major League Baseball players suspended for drug offenses
Nippon Professional Baseball pitchers
Oklahoma City Dodgers players
Pensacola Blue Wahoos players
People from West Hills, Los Angeles
Peoria Javelinas players
Rancho Cucamonga Quakes players
Venados de Mazatlán players
American expatriate baseball players in Mexico
Chatsworth High School alumni